India competed in the 2017 Summer Deaflympics which was held in Samsun, Turkey. India sent a delegation consisting of 46 participants for the event.

This was the 13th time that India participated at the Summer Deaflympics since making its Deaflympic debut in 1965. The delegation included Rohit Bhaker, who competed in his 6th Deaflympic event as the most experienced competitor for India at the multi-sport event along with Virender Singh, who was competing in his 4th Deaflympic event. Indian delegation mainly dominated in the sport of wrestling including a solitary gold medal won by Virender Singh in the men's 74 kg category.

Overall, Indian athletes claimed 5 medals in the event including a gold medal and 2  bronze medals in the men's wrestling categories. Amateur ladies golfer Diksha Dagar claimed a silver medal in the women's individual event as a part of the golf competition which made its debut at the 2017 Summer Deaflympics, in fact she also became the only Indian golfer to receive a Deaflympic medal.

Criticism 
The Indian medalists at the multi-sport event complained, argued and protested against the Indian government as the government failed to honour and recognise the achievements of the Indian wrestlers at the competition. Several critics revealed and criticized that only Olympic and Paralympic medal winners are honoured and recognised in India but not the Deaflympic participants and Deaflympic medal winners.

Medalists

Medal table

References

External links 
 India at the Deaflympics

Nations at the 2017 Summer Deaflympics
2017 in Indian sport
India at the Deaflympics